Khedive is an unincorporated community in southeastern Saskatchewan, Canada. The former village was formally dissolved in 2002. The community has a warm-summer humid continental climate, or Dfb, climate type.

Demographics 

References

Norton No. 69, Saskatchewan
Designated places in Saskatchewan
Former villages in Saskatchewan
Populated places disestablished in 2002
2002 disestablishments in Saskatchewan
Division No. 2, Saskatchewan